Darnerien Richard McCants (born August 1, 1978) is a former gridiron football wide receiver. He was drafted by the Washington Redskins in the fifth round of the 2001 NFL Draft. He played college football at Delaware State.

McCants played for the Philadelphia Eagles, Hamilton Tiger-Cats, Baltimore Ravens and Montreal Alouettes.

Early years
As a senior at Arundel High School in Gambrills, Maryland, McCants was an All-State, All-County and All-Metro selection in one season of organized high school football. He led his teams to county and regional championships.

McCants was also a state champion in the high jump.

McCants previously played one year of JV football at Oakland Mills High School in Columbia, Maryland before transferring to Arundel.

He spent his freshman year at Wilde Lake High School in Columbia, Maryland.

College career
At Delaware State University, McCants played his best season as a senior, at tight end, tallying career-highs of 36 catches, 692 receiving yards and 18 touchdowns. His touchdown total set Delaware State and MEAC records, and was No. 1 in NCAA Division I-AA.

Professional career

Washington Redskins
McCants was drafted by the Washington Redskins in the fifth round of the 2001 NFL Draft. After showing promise as an end zone threat in 2003, He fell out of favor with the new coaching staff and spent much of 2004 on the inactive list. He was released after the 2004 season.

Philadelphia Eagles
Before the 2005 season McCants signed with the Philadelphia Eagles. When active in 2005, he primarily played on special teams. He was released prior to the 2006 season.

Hamilton Tiger-Cats
On July 11, 2007, McCants was signed by the Hamilton Tiger-Cats with whom he played three games.

Team Tennessee
On January 26, 2008, he was selected 38th overall by Team Tennessee in the 2008 AAFL Draft.

Baltimore Ravens
On July 25, 2008, McCants signed with the Baltimore Ravens. He was later released on August 26.

Montreal Alouettes
On December 18, 2008, McCants signed with the Montreal Alouettes.

He was released by the Alouettes on March 17, 2009.

Music career
Outside of football, Darnerien is an R&B singer, signed by the record label MacVizion LLC. McCants says his music is inspired by artists such as R. Kelly and Michael Jackson.

Coaching
McCants worked as a personal trainer upon retiring from football in 2009. McCants lives in Ashburn, Virginia and prior to 2019 he coached there at both Briar Woods High School and Rock Ridge High School for six years. In 2019 McCants became a jumping coach for the track team at Wilde Lake High School in Columbia, Maryland which he had attended as a freshman. In September 2021, he was listed as Wilde Lake's head coach for cross country and boys indoor track, as well as assistant coach for boys outdoor track.

McCants has expressed the intent to become an educator, having majored in education at Delaware State. In 2020, he started the nonprofit Finding Me Foundation which seeks to combat juvenile delinquency by introducing children to reading.

In 2017 and 2019, McCants played in the biennial Congressional Football Game for Charity, an event featuring members of Congress and former NFL players playing against Capitol Police officers to benefit the Capitol Police Memorial Fund, Our Military Kids and A Advantage 4 Kids.

References

External links
Just Sports Stats
Official Website

1978 births
Living people
American football wide receivers
American players of Canadian football
Baltimore Ravens players
Canadian football wide receivers
Delaware State Hornets football players
Hamilton Tiger-Cats players
Montreal Alouettes players
People from Gambrills, Maryland
People from Odenton, Maryland
Philadelphia Eagles players
Players of American football from Maryland
Sportspeople from Anne Arundel County, Maryland
Washington Redskins players